Jasminum malabaricum, the Malabar jasmine or wild jasmine, is a species of flowering plant in the family Oleaceae, native to southern parts of India, and Sri Lanka.

Etymology
'Jasminum' is a Latinized form of the Arabic word, 'yasemin' for sweetly scented plants.

Common names
 English: Malabar jasmine, wild jasmine 
 Marathi: कुसर kusar, रान मोगरा ran mogra 
 Sinhala: Pichcha
 Tamil: கொடிவகை kotivakai 
 Kannada: Kadu mallige 
 Sanskrit: मुद्गर mudgara

References

Jasminum malabaricum Wight, Ic. t. 1250. 1848; Hook. f., Fl. Brit. India 3: 594. 1882; Gamble, Fl. Pres. Madras 789(554). 1923; Manilal & Sivar., Fl. Calicut 160. 1982; Ansari, Fl. Kasaragod Div. 223. 1985; Ramach. & V.J. Nair, Fl. Cannanore Dist. 270. 1988; Manilal, Fl. Silent Valley 171. 1988; Sasidh. et al., Bot. Stud. Med. Pl. Kerala 24. 1996; P. S. Green, Kew Bull. 58: 287. 2003; Ratheesh Narayanan, Fl. Stud. Wayanad Dist. 510. 2009.

External links

 
 
 
 

malabaricum